Ponferrada railway station is the railway station of the Spanish city of Ponferrada.

History
The station was opened in 1882, with the opening of Brañuelas - Ponferrada section in Palencia - A Coruña railway.

Services
Ponferrada station is a compulsory stop for all the passenger trains of the line That circumstance allows to have direct connections with the most important cities of the North of the country, besides other places like Zaragoza or Barcelona. Alvia services are operated to A Coruña, Vigo-Guixar, Barcelona Sants and Madrid-Chamartín. The Regional Express service goes to León and Vigo-Guixar, and also links with towns as Monforte de Lemos or Astorga.

References

Railway stations in Castile and León
Ponferrada